Hampton is a rural town and locality in the Toowoomba Region, Queensland, Australia.

Geography 
Situated at the top of an escarpment on the Great Dividing Range, Hampton is one of the small town located along the New England Highway between Toowoomba, (29 kilometres away) and Crows Nest (12 kilometres).

There are three local dams that supply water to the surrounding area, all within a short distance of Hampton.  These are Cooby Dam, Perseverance Dam and Cressbrook Dam.  Recreational activities are available on some of the dams.

Climate 
The local flora and fauna are abundant to include many species of birds and mammals. Eucalypt and pine forests as well as grass land are present in this area.

History
The town was named after its former railway station, which in turn was named after Hampton then in Middlesex, England.

In 1886, the Crows Nest railway line reached the town.

Hampton Post Office opened on 19 May 1913 (a receiving office had been open from 1887) and closed in 1977.

Hampton State School opened on 22 August 1938. It closed in 1959.

Education 
There are no schools in Hampton. The nearest government primary schools are Geham State School in Geham to the south-west and Murphys Creek State School in Murphys Creek to the south. The nearest government secondary schools are Crows Nest State School (to Year 10) in Crows Nest to the north and Highfields State Secondary College (to Year 12) in Highfields, Toowoomba, to the south-west.

Attractions
Hampton is known for the antique shop and gift stores as well as local produce, including citrus and avocados grown on the many farms located around the district. The Hampton Information Centre is located on the New England Highway at the junction of the Esk–Hampton Road.  The road provides access to Ravensbourne National Park and connects Hampton to Esk.  Ravensbourne National Park features short bushwalking tracks, a scenic lookout and picnic facilities. In May the park surrounding the Visitor Information Center plays host to the Hampton High Country Food and Art Festival. The festival gives local producers from all over the Darling Downs a chance to showcase their produce.

References

External links
 Town map, 1980
 Hampton High Country Food and Arts Festival
 Ravensbourne National Park

Towns in Queensland
Towns in the Darling Downs
Toowoomba Region
Localities in Queensland